Claude Lecouteux (born 8 February 1943) is a French philologist and medievalist who specializes in Germanic studies. He is Professor Emeritus and Chair of the Literature and Civilization of Medieval Germanic Peoples at Sorbonne University. 

In 1986 Lecouteux published what is now regarded as a seminal history of ghosts from 500 to 1500, relying largely on literary sources.

Biography
Claude Lecouteux received a PhD in Germanic studies from Sorbonne University in 1975, and a DA from the Blaise Pascal University in 1980. From 1981 to 1992, Lecouteux was Professor and Chair of the Languages, Literatures and Civilizations of Germanic Peoples at the University of Caen Normandy. From 1992 to 2007, Lecouteux was Professor and Chair of Medieval Germanic Literature at Sorbonne University. Since 2007, Lecouteux has been Professor Emeritus and Chair of the Literature and Civilization of Medieval Germanic Peoples at Sorbonne University.

Lecouteux was made a Knight of the Ordre des Palmes académiques in 1996, and an Officer of the Ordre des Arts et des Lettres in 2006.

Select bibliography 
The Melusinian Motiv in German mediaeval Literature (doctoral thesis, 1980)

Books

See also
 Rudolf Simek
 John Lindow

References

Interview with Claude Lecouteux
maison-hantee.com
US publishers page

External links
 Claude Lecouteux at Academia.edu

1943 births
French medievalists
French male non-fiction writers
Germanic studies scholars
Living people
Officiers of the Ordre des Arts et des Lettres
Blaise Pascal University alumni
Paris-Sorbonne University alumni
Academic staff of Paris-Sorbonne University
Writers on Germanic paganism